5th Online Film Critics Society Awards
January 2, 2002

Best Film: 
 Memento  Mulholland Drive
The 5th Online Film Critics Society Awards, honoring the best in filmmaking in 2001, were given on 2 January 2002.

Top 10 films
Memento (tied for 1st place with Mulholland Drive)
Mulholland Drive (tied for 1st place with Memento)
The Lord of the Rings: The Fellowship of the Ring
Ghost World
In the Bedroom
Moulin Rouge!
The Man Who Wasn't There
Shrek
Gosford Park (tied for 9th place with The Royal Tenenbaums)
The Royal Tenenbaums (tied for 9th place with Gosford Park)

Winners and nominees

Best Picture
Memento 
Mulholland Drive
Ghost World
In the Bedroom
The Lord of the Rings: The Fellowship of the Ring

Best Director
David Lynch – Mulholland Drive
Joel Coen – The Man Who Wasn't There
Todd Field – In the Bedroom
Peter Jackson – The Lord of the Rings: The Fellowship of the Ring
Baz Luhrmann – Moulin Rouge!
Christopher Nolan – Memento

Best Actor
Billy Bob Thornton – The Man Who Wasn't There
Russell Crowe – A Beautiful Mind
Guy Pearce – Memento
Denzel Washington – Training Day
Tom Wilkinson – In the Bedroom

Best Actress
Naomi Watts – Mulholland Drive
Thora Birch – Ghost World
Nicole Kidman – The Others
Sissy Spacek – In the Bedroom
Tilda Swinton – The Deep End

Best Supporting Actor
Steve Buscemi – Ghost World
Ben Kingsley – Sexy Beast
Jude Law – A.I. Artificial Intelligence
Ian McKellen – The Lord of the Rings: The Fellowship of the Ring
Tony Shalhoub – The Man Who Wasn't There

Best Supporting Actress
Jennifer Connelly – A Beautiful Mind
Scarlett Johansson – Ghost World
Helen Mirren – Gosford Park
Maggie Smith – Gosford Park
Marisa Tomei – In the Bedroom

Best Original Screenplay
Mulholland Drive – David Lynch The Others – Alejandro AmenábarGosford Park – Julian Fellowes
The Man Who Wasn't There – Joel and Ethan Coen
The Royal Tenenbaums – Wes Anderson and Owen Wilson

Best Adapted ScreenplayMemento – Christopher NolanA.I. Artificial Intelligence – Steven Spielberg
Ghost World – Daniel Clowes and Terry Zwigoff
In the Bedroom – Todd Field and Rob Festinger
The Lord of the Rings: The Fellowship of the Ring – Fran Walsh, Philippa Boyens and Peter Jackson

Best Foreign Language FilmAmélie
Fat Girl
In the Mood for Love
No Man's Land
With a Friend Like Harry...

Best Documentary
Startup.com
Down from the Mountain
The Endurance
The Gleaners and I
Keep the River on Your Right: A Modern Cannibal Tale

Best Animated Feature
Shrek
Atlantis: The Lost Empire
Final Fantasy: The Spirits Within
Monsters, Inc.
Waking Life

Best Cinematography
The Man Who Wasn't There – Roger DeakinsA.I. Artificial Intelligence – Janusz Kamiński
The Lord of the Rings: The Fellowship of the Ring – Andrew Lesnie
Moulin Rouge! – Donald McAlpine
Mulholland Drive – Peter Deming

Best EnsembleGosford Park
Ghost World
The Lord of the Rings: The Fellowship of the Ring
Ocean's Eleven
The Royal Tenenbaums

Best Original Score
Mulholland Drive – Angelo BadalamentiA.I. Artificial Intelligence – John Williams
The Lord of the Rings: The Fellowship of the Ring – Howard Shore
Moulin Rouge! – Craig Armstrong and Marius de Vries
Ocean's Eleven – David Holmes

Best Overall DVDMoulin Rouge!
Almost Famous Untitled: The Bootleg Cut
Citizen Kane
The Godfather Collection
Shrek

Breakthrough Filmmaker
Christopher Nolan – Memento
Todd Field – In the Bedroom
Alejandro González Iñárritu – Amores Perros
Richard Kelly – Donnie Darko
John Cameron Mitchell – Hedwig and the Angry Inch

Breakthrough Performer
Naomi Watts – Mulholland Drive
Hayden Christensen – Life as a House
John Cameron Mitchell – Hedwig and the Angry Inch
Audrey Tautou – Amélie

References 

2001
2001 film awards